Glade Hill (also known as Gladehill) is an unincorporated community in Franklin County, Virginia, United States. Glade Hill has a post office with ZIP code 24092, which opened on April 1, 1837.

The Burwell-Holland House was listed on the National Register of Historic Places in 2002.

References

Unincorporated communities in Franklin County, Virginia
Unincorporated communities in Virginia